Balkan Express may refer to

 Balkan Express (train) - A former international train service between Istanbul and Belgrade and formerly Budapest.
 Balkan (train) - The shortened remnant of the Balkan Express operating between Sofia and Belgrade.
 Balkan Express (film) - A 1983 Yugoslavian film, directed by Branko Baletić.